Mscape was a mobile media gaming platform developed by Hewlett Packard that could be used to create location-based games. The development of Mscape was discontinued (and its website mscapers.com shut down) on March 31, 2010.

The Mscape platform is flexible. HP encourages developers to use Mscape to create not just games, but also informational guides to points of interest, imaginative stories about places, and practical information about worksites. Mscape makes a player's GPS location an element of the gameplay. Events in a game are triggered by a player's location, and the player interacts with a game by moving from place to place.

Mscape is used to create mediascapes, interactive experiences made up of video, audio, images, and text. Mscape stores the digital media files in a structure that associates them with positions from a GPS system. Players play mediascapes on a Windows Mobile device, such as a mobile phone or a PDA, that's GPS enabled. As players move around, the device senses their position and activates the appropriate media files.

History

Mscape had its origins in 2002 as Mobile Bristol, a project that explored how mobile devices and pervasive information technology could enhance people's interactions with their physical environments and with each other in urban and public spaces.

With funding from the British government, researchers in HP Labs Bristol, the University of Bristol, and Appliance Studio collaborated on several trials, working with artists, writers, educators, and others to create a series of interactive, context-aware mobile experiences. In one trial, visitors to Bristol's harbor could virtually navigate the history of what was once one of Britain's busiest ports. In another, middle school students could experience life as a lion by walking around a virtual savannah.

In 2007, HP made the authoring suite and mobile player software available for download at no cost from the Mscapers community website.

Technology

Mscape has evolved from research in Augmented reality (which deals with the combination of real world and computer generated data) and from developments in location-based services (services available through a mobile device based on the device’s geographical location). The Mscape technology is also an example of Ubiquitous computing and a context-aware pervasive system.

Three technologies are essential to mediascapes: portable computing, embedded sensors, and context-coded information and services.

Portable computing. Mscape has been made practical by the ready availability of consumer GPS navigation devices such as GPS-equipped PDAs and smartphones.

Embedded sensors. The publicly available version of Mscape currently takes advantage only of a player’s GPS location., However, experimental deployments of mediascapes have made use of other types of sensors, such as short-range radio beacons and heart rate monitors. The Mscape technology enables developers to create plug-ins to easily incorporate data from sensors such as infrared and radio frequency beacons, RFID tags, digital compasses, and other types of sensors.

Context-coded information. Media — images, video, audio, and Flash interactions — is triggered by the logic assigned to a specific space. The logic can not only define behavior based on a person’s presence with the space, but can also vary the behavior based on the number of times the person has entered the space. Media types include:

 HTML, MP3, and WAV audio
 JPEG and GIF images
 MPEG, WMV, and SWF video and Flash interactions

For future implementations, Hewlett-Packard proposes a client-server architecture using streaming media over a wireless network. Such implementations would enable multi-player games. Streaming media over a wireless network would also be useful in contexts in which content needs to be updated frequently to reflect rapidly changing information or time-based data.

Tools

Mscape Player

Mscape Player plays mediascapes on Windows Mobile devices, such as mobile phones or PDAs, that are GPS enabled.

Mscape Library

Developers and players use Mscape Library to manage the mediascapes they have on their computers. Players download mediascapes from the Mscapers website into Mscape Library. They then use Mscape Library to copy those mediascapes to their Windows Mobile device. Developers can also use Mscape Library to launch Mscape Maker and Mscape Tester.,

Mscape Library also detects whether a Windows Mobile device has Mscape Player installed on it, alerts the user if it doesn't, and installs the player.

Mscape Maker

Developers use Mscape Maker to create mediascapes. Mscape Maker has four work areas:

Place Editor. Developers use the place editor to set up the map that's the basis of the mediascape. The map comprises both an image and the GPS coordinates that associate the map image with a real place on the surface of the earth. Once the map is set up, a developer defines areas on the map that trigger digital media and interactions with the mediascape. Simple mediascapes can be created by dragging and dropping components onto the map in the Place Editor.

Script Editor. In the script editor, developers use a much simplified version of C# to script events. HP compares Mscape's scripting language to Adobe Flash ActionScript. Their intent is to make Mscape's scripting language simple enough for beginners: "you can pick it up fairly quickly and you can achieve quite advanced things without having to do lots of programming."

Script Object Window. The script object window lists all the script objects that are used in a mediascape. Developers use scripts to manipulate and coordinate four types of script objects:

 Media — audio, video, Flash movies, and web pages
 Sensors — GPS coordinates, places (based on MapLib files), regions, and speakers (audio that appears to come from a particular point)
 States — numeric, text, and true/false variables
 Tools — buttons, timers, alarms, playlists, and so on

Properties Window. Developers use the properties window to view and change the properties of script objects.

Mscape Maker saves mediascapes in two file formats:

 .msl files are the native format in the authoring environment.
 .msz files are the compressed format played on a Windows Mobile device.

Mscape Tester

Mscape Tester simulates what a mediascape looks like on a Windows Mobile device. A developer can place a small figure at any point on the mediascape's map to test the gameplay at that point.

Licensing

The Mscape platform is available under either a non-commercial license (for not-for-profit or educational use) or a commercial license.

Developers who upload mediascapes to the community website can offer their mediascapes to other users either under a default license (a non–exclusive, royalty–free, worldwide, perpetual license to use, reproduce, distribute, display, perform, or prepare derivative works of the mediascape) or under a Creative Commons license.

Types of mediascapes

Mediascapes can be either portable or anchored.

 Portable mediascapes can be played anywhere. They typically require players to set up the game area before beginning to play.
 Anchored mediascapes can be played only in the specific place they were designed for.

Because the events in mediascapes are triggered by GPS coordinates, mediascapes can offer users various types of experiences of a place.

 Games present some sort of challenge. Players can win or lose, succeed or fail.
 Guides provide specific facts about how the place is now or was in the past. They focus on information
 Stories are an imaginative treatment of facts or fiction. They focus on feelings and thoughts places evoke.

Developers

Members of the HP Labs team who contributed to the development of Mscape were:

 Phil Stenton
 Richard Hull
 Patrick Goddi
 Josephine Reid
 Ben Clayton
 Tom Melamed
 Susie Wee
 Erik Geelhoed

Members of the HP Labs team who contributed to the development of the Mscapers community website were:

 Andrew Dahley
 Patrick Goddi
 Kurt MacDonald
 Allen Arakaki

See also

 Augmented Reality
 Augmented Virtuality
 GPS tour
 I-Tours
 Mediascape
 Mixed Reality
 Scvngr

Notes

References

Stenton, S. P., R. Hull, P. M. Goddi, J. E. Reid, B. J. Clayton, T. J. Melamed and S. Wee (2007). "Mediascapes: Context-Aware Multimedia Experiences." IEEE MultiMedia 14(3): 98 - 105.

External links
 HP Labs Bristol
 BBC Northern Ireland Mobile Learning

Video game engines
HP software
Virtual reality
Outdoor locating games